Fung Hing Wa (born 12 December 1992 in Hong Kong) is a Hong Kong professional football player who currently plays as a centre back for Hong Kong Premier League club Lee Man.

Club career

In 2005, Fung through a project to go to Newcastle United to have training. 

In 2008, Fung signed for Hong Kong Third Division club Sham Shui Po. 

In 2012, Fung signed for Hong Kong First Division club Yokohama FC Hong Kong. 

In 2015, Fung signed for Hong Kong Premier League club Pegasus.

On 17 July 2019, Eastern announced the signing of Fung at their season opening media event.

On 30 June 2020, it was confirmed that Fung had left the club in order to sign with R&F. 

On 19 November 2020, Fung announced that he reached a mutual termination with R&F and had returned to Eastern.

On 19 June 2022, Fung left Eastern again.

On 15 July 2022, Fung joined Lee Man.

International career
On 11 December 2019, Fung made his international debut for Hong Kong in the match against South Korea in the 2019 EAFF E-1 Football Championship.

Career Statistics

Club

As of 20 May 2021

International

Honours

Club
Sham Shui Po
 Hong Kong Second Division: 2010–11
 Hong Kong Third Division: 2009–10

Pegasus
 Hong Kong FA Cup: 2015–16
 Hong Kong Sapling Cup: 2015–16

Tai Po
 Hong Kong Premier League: 2018–19
Hong Kong Sapling Cup: 2016–17
Eastern

 Hong Kong Sapling Cup: 2020–21

References

External links
 Fung Hing Wa at HKFA
 
 

1992 births
Living people
Yokohama FC Hong Kong players
TSW Pegasus FC players
Tai Po FC players
Eastern Sports Club footballers
R&F (Hong Kong) players
Lee Man FC players
Hong Kong Premier League players
Hong Kong footballers
Hong Kong international footballers
Association football defenders
Association football central defenders